The 2006 SEC softball tournament was held at the Georgia Softball Stadium on the campus of the University of Georgia in Athens, Georgia from May 11 through May 13, 2006.  Tennessee won the tournament and earned the Southeastern Conference's automatic bid to the NCAA tournament.

Tournament

All-Tournament Team
P-Monica Abbott, Tennessee
P-Emily Turner, LSU
C-Killian Roessner, LSU
1B-Tonya Callahan, Tennessee
2B-Vanessa Soto, LSU
3B-Lauren Delahoussaye, LSU
SS-Lindsay Schutzler, Tennessee
OF-Sarah Fekete, Tennessee
OF-Brittany Rogers, Alabama
OF-Katherine Card, Tennessee
DP-India Chiles, Tennessee
MVP - Monica Abbott, Tennessee

See also
Women's College World Series
NCAA Division I Softball Championship
SEC Tournament

References

SEC softball tournament
2006 Southeastern Conference softball season